King Tai of Zhou or Gugong Danfu was a great leader of the Zhou clan during the Shang dynasty. His great-grandson Fa would later conquer the Shang and establish the Zhou dynasty.

Name
"King Tai" was a posthumous name bestowed upon him by his descendants. He was never a king during his lifetime. He was earlier known as Old Duke Danfu (Gugong Danfu), for instance, in the Classic of Poetry.  Occasionally, a few scholars refer to him as Ji Danfu, referencing his surname Ji.

History
In the family hymns recorded in the Classic of Poetry, the Ji family is traced from the miraculous birth of the Xia dynasty culture hero and court official Houji caused by his mother's stepping into a footprint left by the supreme god Shangdi. The Records of the Grand Historian instead make Houji the son of the Emperor Ku, connecting his family to the Yellow Emperor who was sometimes also given the Zhou's surname.

Sima Qian goes on to record Houji's son Buzhu abandoning court life and his fief of Tai, apparently taking up the nomadic life of the Rong and Di tribes around Xia. His son Ju continued this before Duke Liu settled his people at a place called Bin. The rulers of Bin were listed as Qingjie, Huangpu, Chaifu, Huiyu, Gongfei, Gaoyu, Yayu, and Gongshu Zulei.

The prosperity of Bin led to attacks from hostile peoples: the Rong, Di, and Xunyu (薰育 / 獯鬻). After four attempts to buy them off failed, the old duke refused to lead his people into battle but instead relocated his family to the foot of Mount Qishan in the Wei valley. After finding his choice confirmed by their oracle bones, the other people who had lived in Bin left the caves and huts they had fled to and followed them, erecting a new city complete with a formal palace, ancestral temple, and altar. The rapid success of the new location then caused neighboring tribes of Yu and Rui to join Zhou, rather than attack.

Danfu was later credited with much of the growth of the Zhou, receiving a hymn among the Great Odes of the Classic of Poetry and the "Mount Qi Song", a zither melody supposedly composed by the Duke of Zhou. In traditional Chinese records, he was considered to have himself created the state of Zhou, sometimes taken to be an indigenous place-name for his new settlement along the Wei River. In fact, modern excavation of the Shang oracle bones have found references to a Zhou polity at least a century before this during the reign of Wu Ding. The earlier Zhou seems to be well away from the traditional locations for Bin, as well, leading scholars to posit a much longer migration west from Shanxi.

Posterity
By his wife, the Lady Jiang, Old Duke Danfu was said to be the father of Taibo, Zhongyong, and Jili. Zhongyong was claimed as the ancestor of the kings of Wu; Jili, by the kings of Zhou. Later, Taibo was claimed by Japan as well.

See also
 Zhou Dynasty
 Ancestry of the Zhou dynasty

References

External links

 Thomson, John. "04. Mount Qi Melody".

Nobility
Shang dynasty people
12th-century BC Chinese monarchs
Founding monarchs